Stanley Mullen ( – 1974) was an American artist, short story writer, novelist and publisher.  He studied writing at the University of Colorado at Boulder and drawing, painting and lithography at the Colorado Springs Fine Arts Center where he was accepted as a professional member in 1937.  A series of his paintings of Indian ceremonial dances is part of the permanent collection of the Denver Art Museum.  Mullen worked as assistant curator of the Colorado State Historical Museum during the 1940s.

Writing career

Mullen wrote over 200 stories and articles in a variety of fields.  He became involved with the small press publisher New Collector's Group (co-founded by Paul Dennis O'Connor and Martin Greenberg) before starting his own small press publisher, Gorgon Press, in 1948.

Gorgon Press published only one book - Mullen's short story collection Moonfoam and Sorceries and was also the imprint under which 11 issues of Mullen's fanzine, The Gorgon, were issued. . His novel Kinsmen of the Dragon was originally planned as a publication of Gorgon Press but was ultimately issued by Shasta Publishers.

Books by Stanley Mullen
 The Sphinx Child (chapbook; New Collectors Group, 1948)
 Moonfoam and Sorceries (short story collection; Gorgon Press, 1948)
 Kinsmen of the Dragon (Shasta Publishers, 1951) (Jacket art by Hannes Bok)

Awards
1959, Mullen's story "Space to Swing a Cat" was nominated for a Hugo Award for Best Short Story.

Notes

References

External links
 
 
 
 
 Stanley Mullen at the Science Fiction Encyclopedia 

20th-century American novelists
American artists
American book publishers (people)
American curators
American fantasy writers
American male novelists
American science fiction writers
Artists from Colorado
1911 births
1974 deaths
20th-century American businesspeople
20th-century American male writers